Bulgarians are the main ethnic group in Bulgaria, according to the census of the population in 2011 they are 6,000,000 people, or 86% of the country's population.

Number and share

Censuses 

Number and share of Bulgarians according to the census over the years:

Number and share of Bulgarians according to the census over the years by provinces:

See also

Demographics of Bulgaria

References

!Bulgaria
Ethnic groups in Bulgaria